Paul Hofer (born May 13, 1952 in Memphis, Tennessee) is a former professional American football player who played running back for six seasons in the NFL. He was a part of the San Francisco 49ers Super Bowl XVI winning team.

Known for his hard and relentless running style, Hofer was a fan favorite despite being on poor 49ers teams in the mid to late 1970s. Hofer was a brutal, attacking runner who suffered serious knee injuries that ultimately shortened his career. Hofer saw limited duty during the 1981 season but was placed on injured reserve before season's end; he was unable to play in the playoffs or the Super Bowl. He retired soon thereafter.

References

1952 births
Living people
People from Memphis, Tennessee
American football running backs
San Francisco 49ers players
Ole Miss Rebels football players